Herborn is a village in the commune of Mompach, in eastern Luxembourg.  , the village had a population of 144.

See also
 List of villages in Luxembourg

External links

Mompach
Villages in Luxembourg